José Mario Ruiz Navas (20 July 1930  – 10 December 2020) was an Ecuadorian Roman Catholic archbishop.

Ruiz Navas was born in Ecuador and was ordained to the priesthood in 1954. He served as bishop of the Roman Catholic Diocese of Latacunga, Ecuador, from 1968 to 1989 and then as bishop and then archbishop of the Roman Catholic Archdiocese of Portoviejo, Ecuador, from 1989 to 2007.

Navas died from COVID-19 in 2020.

Notes

1930 births
2020 deaths
20th-century Roman Catholic archbishops in Ecuador
21st-century Roman Catholic archbishops in Ecuador
Roman Catholic archbishops of Portoviejo
Deaths from the COVID-19 pandemic in Ecuador